Augusta Springs, Virginia is a census-designated place (CDP) in Augusta County, Virginia, United States. The population at the 2010 Census was 257.

References

Census-designated places in Virginia
Census-designated places in Augusta County, Virginia